Chitinamit (or Chitinamit-Chujuyup) is an archeological site of the Maya civilization in the highlands of Guatemala. It has been identified as Jakawitz, the first capital of the K'iche' Maya. The site is located in the El Quiché department, in the municipality of Uspantán.

Site description
The site overlooks the Queca River in a rugged region that is considered particularly poor for agriculture, it is therefore likely that the mountain-top location was selected because it was readily defensible. The site is located on the mountain of Chujuyup, on the western edge of the Chuyujup Valley and was excavated in 1977 by Kenneth Brown of the University of Houston. It is defended by a stone rampart and possesses stone terraces, together with a ballcourt and a temple to the K'iche' patron god, also named Jakawitz. Its occupation seems to have come to a violent end, with many projectile points being found together with evidence of the burning of buildings.

These structures differ from the architectural style of the original Maya population and are presumed to represent the style of intrusive K'iche' lineages. The site is arranged around an enclosed plaza.

See also
Cerro Quiac
Chojolom
K'iche' Kingdom of Q'umarkaj
Q'umarkaj

Notes

References

 
 
 
 
 

Maya sites in Guatemala
Archaeological sites in Guatemala
Former populated places in Guatemala
Quiché Department
K'iche'